The siege of Clonmel, from 27 April to 18 May 1650, took place during the Cromwellian conquest of Ireland, when Clonmel in County Tipperary was besieged by 8,000 men from the New Model Army under Oliver Cromwell. The garrison of 1,500 commanded by Hugh Dubh O'Neill eventually surrendered after inflicting heavy casualties on the besiegers. 

O'Neill escaped with some of his troops, but although the Irish Confederate Wars continued until 1653, Clonmel ended effective  Royalist resistance in Ireland, and Cromwell returned to England immediately afterwards.

Background
The garrison at Clonmel changed as the arrival of the Puritan army through Kilkenny became imminent. In November 1649, the town's Mayor John Bennet White wrote to the Duke of Ormond seeking military assistance. Colonel Oliver Stephenson and part of the old Confederate army, mostly from County Clare, took up quarters. The southern Confederates were not fully trusted by the townspeople, particularly after the fall of Carrick on Suir due to treachery. Ormond arrived in person at the end of the month and the Clare men were replaced by experienced soldiers from Ulster under O'Neill, a veteran of siege warfare in the Thirty Years' War. Under his command were 1,500 soldiers from the Irish Ulster army, mostly from the modern counties of Tyrone and Cavan. These two regiments had served under Owen Roe O'Neill and were now led by his nephew. They were accompanied by two troops of cavalry under Colonel Edmond Fennell of Ballygriffin, Co. Cork. O'Neill sent reinforcements to some outlying fortifications at Ballydine, Kilcash and 'Castle Caonagh' (Mountain Castle). Even before the siege commenced, provisioning the new influx was causing difficulties, Ormond proving unable to adequately supply them. As other walled towns in the vicinity capitulated with little resistance, tension in the town rose as evidenced by correspondence between O'Neill and Ormond.

To which Ormond responded in the following terms :

Cromwell was in a hurry to take the town as he had been summoned back to England by Parliament to deal with a Royalist uprising there. As a result, he tried to take Clonmel immediately by assault, rather than opt for a lengthy siege.

Assault
Cromwell's artillery, positioned on a hill near present-day Melview, battered a breach in the town walls. It was intended that his infantry would storm this breach and then open the nearby North town gate to allow access to Cromwell and the Parliamentarian cavalry.

However, O'Neill put all able-bodied townspeople to work building a coupure inside the breach lined with artillery, muskets, and pikemen. The coupure was V-shaped, starting at the mouth of the breach and narrowing until it ended about 50 metres inside the town. At the end of the breach, O'Neill positioned two cannon, loaded with chain-shot. The area behind the breach became, in military terms, a "killing field". The Parliamentarian infantry which assaulted the breach was engaged by pikemen and repeatedly cut down by marksmen on the earthworks behind until the soldiers finally refused to make any further attacks on what was a death trap. Cromwell then appealed to his elite cavalry, the Ironsides to make a fresh assault on foot. This time the Irish allowed them to enter at first without resistance.

A British officer of Sir John Clotworthy's regiment described the entry of the Ironsides into the town, the bulk of them belonging to Ireton's regiment.

Cromwell was with a second assault force waiting for the town North (or Lough) gate to be opened by the party that had stormed the breach. When he saw that the initial assault had failed and that as night was approaching, even if the disheartened soldiers could be persuaded to enter the breach once more, he judged that it would be futile against the internal defences without artillery support so he decided to end the assault for the day.

Surrender
Cromwell knew that O'Neill's garrison and supplies were severely depleted and planned the next morning to try a fresh assault with close artillery support to batter the coupure and its defenders. However, O'Neill's men were out of ammunition and slipped away under the cover of darkness – making their way to Waterford. Cromwell negotiated a surrender with the town's mayor, John White, believing that Clonmel was still heavily defended. The surrender terms stipulated that the lives and property of the townspeople would be respected. After agreeing to the surrender terms, Cromwell found out that O'Neill and the Confederates had slipped away and that he had been deceived. Although he was angry, Cromwell made his men abide by the terms of the surrender agreement and treat the townspeople and their property with respect.

Aftermath
After five weeks of close investment and nearly three months since the first elements of the New Model Army appeared before the town the New Model Army's losses were between 2,000 and 2,500, with hundreds more wounded, its largest ever loss in a single action.

See also
Wars of the Three Kingdoms
Irish battles

Notes

Citations

Sources

General references

 Chapter XIX Note: This is a "historical novel," and not a contemporary eyewitness account.

Clonmel
Clonmel
1650 in Ireland
Clonmel
Clonmel
Clonmel
Clonmel